Mina Parian (also Romanized as Mīnā Parīān; also known as Parīān-e Mīnā) is a village in Gol Gol Rural District, in the Central District of Kuhdasht County, Lorestan Province, Iran. At the 2006 census, its population was 111, in 26 families.

References 

Towns and villages in Kuhdasht County